Fort Grozny is a motorsport complex and the largest in the North Caucasus, located in Grozny, Chechnya, Russia.

Description 
The route was laid in the Zavodskoy district of Grozny, on the site of a former oil refinery. The area of the autodrome is 60 hectares. On this area, there are tracks for karting (1314 m), circuit races (3086 m), autocross (1250 m), jeep trial, pair races, drift and drag racing (1000 m). There is a "Safari" lane for motorcycles and off-road vehicles with obstacles up to 4 meters high and 30-degree inclines. The autodrome is able to host international competitions. The autodrome is designed for 1600 spectators.

Competition
On average, up to 70 events of various levels were held at the autodrome per year as of 2015. Among the all-Russian competitions, Formula-Master Russia in the 2015 season and stages of the Russian Circuit Racing Series since 2016 have been held at the circuit.

Lap records
The official race lap records at the Fort Grozny Autodrom are listed as:

References 

Sport in Grozny
Motorsport venues in Russia